International Home Foods (IHF) was an American manufacturer, distributor and marketer of food products, based in Parsippany, New Jersey. It was acquired in 2000 by ConAgra Foods and merged into ConAgra's Grocery Products division. IHF's best known brands were Chef Boyardee pasta products, Bumble Bee Seafood, PAM cooking spray, and Gulden's mustard.

History 
The company was founded in November 1996 when American Home Products spun off its food business, American Home Foods, which was acquired by private equity firm Hicks, Muse, Tate & Furst and C. Dean Metropoulos & Co. and renamed International Home Foods. The latter paid  to acquire 80% of IHF. Dean Metropoulos became chairman and CEO following the acquisition.

In July 1997, IHF acquired Bumble Bee Seafoods out of bankruptcy protection for  plus assumption of debt. IHF went public in November 1997 and subsequently made a number of acquisitions in quick succession.

Following poor stock performance in 1998, its price dropping by over two-thirds in six months, IHF began looking for a buyer. The company's valuation issues were largely caused by investor disinterest in a company with such widely diversified brands. In December 1998, ConAgra offered IHF $20 per share but IHF rejected the offer as too low. This was followed by multiple negotiations with other companies over an 18 month period, none of which materialized.

The company bought Canadian canned seafood brands Clover Leaf and Paramount in 1999 from George Weston Ltd. and later that year raised  in 1999 with its sale of the Polaner fruit spreads brand to B&G Foods.

IHF was finally acquired in June 2000 by ConAgra Foods in a  deal, $2 per share higher than ConAgra's initial 1998 offer. Much of the former IHF operation was integrated into ConAgra's Irvine, California-based ConAgra Grocery Products division.

Brands 
During its four years in operation, International Home Foods owned a variety of brands including:

 Bumble Bee Seafood
 Campfire marshmallows
 Chef Boyardee pasta
 Clover Leaf Seafoods
 Crunch 'n Munch popcorn
 Dennison's chili
 Grist Mill cereals
 Gulden's mustard
 Jiffy Pop popcorn
 Libby's canned meats
 Louis Kemp
 Luck's canned foods
 Maypo cereal
 Orleans
 PAM cooking spray
 Paramount seafood
 Polaner fruit spreads
 Puritan stews
 Ranch Style Beans
 Ro-Tel canned tomatoes and chilis
 Venice Maid canned pasta and soup

References

External links 
 

Conagra Brands
Food and drink companies established in 1996
Companies based in Morris County, New Jersey
2000 mergers and acquisitions